The Realpha, also known as RE, was a Rhodesian Formula One racing car. The car was built by Ray Reed at his base in Gwelo, and was structurally based on a Cooper. Like many South African home-built Formula One cars of the time, it was fitted with an Alfa Romeo Giulietta engine.

Under the "Ray's Engineering" banner, Reed entered the car in the non-championship Rand Grand Prix Formula One event in South Africa in late 1964, but retired due to an engine failure during the first heat. He also entered the 1965 South African Grand Prix, but the entry was withdrawn before the race when Reed was killed in an air crash.

The car later appeared at the 1966 Rhodesian Grand Prix, the last round of that year's South African Drivers Championship, entered by local driver Peter Huson, but he retired from the race after an accident.



Results

Complete Formula One World Championship results

Complete Formula One non-championship results

Complete South African Drivers Championship results

References

Formula One constructors
Zimbabwean racecar constructors